Bernathonomus punktata is a moth of the family Erebidae. It is found in Brazil.

References

Phaegopterina
Moths described in 1933